Neil McLennan (September 2, 1777, 1778, or 1787 – 1867) was an early Scottish-American settler of Texas. McLennan County, Texas, was named for him.

McLennan was born on the Isle of Skye in Scotland. In 1801, he and a large group of family and friends immigrated to Richmond County, North Carolina, later moving further south to Florida. The McLennans were Gaelic speakers and Presbyterians. Around 1820, they were invited by Yuchi Chief Sam Story to become the first white settlers in Walton County, Florida. In December, 1834, Neil and his brothers Laughlin and John, along with some of their families and friends, immigrated to Texas, sailing a self-built three-masted schooner from Pensacola, Florida, to the mouth of the Brazos River, where they arrived in March, 1835.

After a short stay at present-day Columbus, Texas, Neil obtained a grant of a league of land at McLennan's Bluff (a mile west of present-day Rosebud, Falls County) in Robertson's Colony in July, 1835, where he and his group settled. Laughlin McLennan and his wife and mother were killed in an Indian raid the following winter, and John was likewise killed in 1838, after which the McLennan group moved to the Robertson Colony's headquarters of Nashville-on-the-Brazos in present-day Milam County.

In 1845, Neil McLennan moved his family to a site on the Bosque River near present-day Waco, and he died at his home there in 1867, renowned as "the patriarch of the Bosque."

References

External links
"Neil McLennan," The Handbook of Texas Online.
"Neil McLennan," Biographical Encyclopedia of Texas, 1880.
"McLennan's Bluff," The Handbook of Texas Online.
McKinnon, John Love. History of Walton County. Atlanta: Byrd Printing, 1911. Online version available at this link through the Florida Heritage Collection of the State University System of Florida.
Middleton, Carol. McLennan genealogy page on her web site, Heritage of the South.

18th-century births
Year of birth uncertain
1867 deaths
Burials at Oakwood Cemetery (Waco, Texas)
People from the Isle of Skye
Scottish emigrants to the United States
People from McLennan County, Texas